WRPN (1600 AM) is a radio station  broadcasting a full service News/Talk/Adult Gold format. Licensed to the city of Ripon, Wisconsin, United States, the station is currently owned by Hometown Broadcasting, LLC. Its original call letters were WCWC, which stood for "Central Wisconsin Canning", the owners of the station. WCWC at one time also had a co-owned FM station, first at 95.9 MHz and later at 96.1 MHz. The call letters were originally WCWC-FM, then later WYUR.

Previous logo

References

External links
WRPN radio station website

RPN
Ripon, Wisconsin
Soft adult contemporary radio stations in the United States
Full service radio stations in the United States